Natholi Oru Cheriya Meenalla is a 2013 Indian Malayalam-language romantic comedy film directed by V. K. Prakash and written by Shankar Ramakrishnan. Starring Fahadh Faasil (in dual roles) and Kamalinee Mukherjee. Principal photography began on 22 November 2012 and wrapped by February 2013. The film is scripted by Shankar Ramakrishnan. The film released on 8 February 2013.The film is loosely based on director's Freaky Chakra.

Plot
Preman is the caretaker of a flat at Cochin. Everyone in the flat calls him 'Natholi'. He faces some unfortunate events in the flat and begins to write a story with the same characters in his real life and plays with their lives in his story. The film revolves around the story of the conflict between Preman and the character he creates. He gradually loses control over the character he creates and it begins to act on its own. The rest of the movie is a display of Preman trying to wrest back control of his character and the ensuing plot twists.

Cast
 Fahadh Faasil as Preman and Narendran
 Kamalinee Mukherjee as Prabha Thomas
 Rima Kallingal as Annie
 P. Balachandran
 Aishwarya as Seenath/ Lakshmi
 Mukundhan as Vasu
 Jayan
 Chinnu Kuruvilla
 Sathaar as Capt. Geethakrishnan 
 Krishna Praba as Kumari
 Mridul Nair
Nandhu
 V. K. Sreeraman as himself
 Govind Padmasurya as Moby
 Kani Kusruti as Flat resident
 Joju George as Chicken merchant
 Krishna as Dr.Krishna IAS

Reception
The film opened to mixed reviews from critics.
Sify.com says "Natholi Oru Cheriya Meenalla is witty and hooks you straight into the narrative with its inherent charm. It's not at all like what you have seen in Malayalam before and it is imperative to applaud the sincerity of the makers. Don't miss this one, if you have an eye for the unconventional."

Paresh C Palicha of Rediff.com says that "Natholi Oru Cheriya Meenalla has to be watched for its wackiness and unadulterated laughter. Don't miss it."

Veeyen of Nowrunning.com wrote 'Natholi' isn't a consistently enjoyable film that you would fall in love with over the weekend. It does prod your thoughts however, and keeps you intellectually engaged. Small fish it certainly ain't; but then, it ain't really big fish either.

Smitha of Oneindia.in says that "You might or might not like Natholi Oru Cheriya Meenalla, but watch it for something different than usual."

References

External links
 

2013 films
2010s Malayalam-language films
Films shot in Kochi
Films set in Kerala
2013 directorial debut films
Films directed by V. K. Prakash